Mehrdad Minavand (30 November 1975 – 27 January 2021) was an Iranian professional footballer and coach. He played mostly as a left midfielder but was also deployed as a left winger or left-back.

Club career
Minavand was born in Tehran. He played for a few clubs, including Keshavarz F.C., Persepolis FC, Sturm Graz (Austria), Sporting Charleroi (Belgium) and Al-Shabab (United Arab Emirates) as well as Sepahan. He last played for Rah Ahan FC, but left the team after the 2005–06 season. He played 21 matches in UEFA Champions League and he is all-time record holder among the Iranian footballers in this feature.

International career
Minavand played for the Iran national team and was a participant at the 1998 FIFA World Cup.

Death
On 21 January 2021, Minavand was hospitalised due to COVID-19. Six days later it was announced that he had died from the virus, aged 45.

Career statistics

International

Scores and results list Iran's goal tally first, score column indicates score after each Minavand goal.

Honours
Persepolis
Iranian League: 1995–96, 1996–97 

Sturm Graz
Austrian Bundesliga: 1998–99
Austrian Cup: 1998–99
Austrian Supercup: 1998, 1999

Individual
AFC Asian Cup Team of the Tournament: 1996

References

External links

1975 births
2021 deaths
Association football wingers
Association football fullbacks
1996 AFC Asian Cup players
1998 FIFA World Cup players
2000 AFC Asian Cup players
Iran international footballers
Iranian expatriate footballers
Iranian footballers
Persepolis F.C. players
R. Charleroi S.C. players
Rah Ahan players
Sepahan S.C. footballers
SK Sturm Graz players
Keshavarz players
Belgian Pro League players
Deaths from the COVID-19 pandemic in Iran